Le Grand Henderson (1901–1964), most often writing under the nom de plume "Le Grand", was a writer and illustrator of books for all ages.

Le Grand was born in 1901 in Torrington, Connecticut.  He attended the Yale School of Fine Arts for four years.  After graduation, he headed for New York City.  He found work designing heating and ventilating equipment, switchboards for submarines, and window and interior displays for Macy's and Bloomingdale's.

He soon tired of living in the city.  He then went to St. Paul, Minnesota, where he began a yearlong journey on a houseboat down the Mississippi River to the Gulf of Mexico.  The Augustus series of books takes place along the Mississippi, based on this trip down the river.

Le Grand is best known for his folklore series (9 books, including Cap'n Dow and the Hole in the Doughnut and Cats for Kansas) for children 4 - 8. The story of "Cap'n Dow and the Hole in the Doughnut" is said to have been written while he personally served as one of the crew of a down-East schooner off the coast of Maine, where men are sailors and doughnuts are doughnuts. He is also known for his Augustus series (12 books) depicting the country-wide adventures of a "Huck Finn"-type lad, for children 8 - 12.  Overall, he wrote over 30 books between 1937 and 1940.

He died in 1964.

Works 

Why Is A Yak?, 1937
Augustus and the River, 1939
Glory Horn, 1941
Augustus Goes South, 1940
Augustus And The mountains, 1941
Saturday For Samuel, 1941
Augustus Helps the Navy, 1942
Augustus Helps The Marines, 1943
Augustus Helps the Army, 1943
Augustus Flies, 1944
Augustus Drives a Jeep, 1944
Augustus Saves A Ship, 1945
Augustus Hits The Road, 1946
Cap'n Dow and the Hole in the Doughnut, 1946
Augustus Rides The Border, 1947
Augustus And The Desert, 1948
Cats For Kansas, 1948
Here Come The Perkinses, 1949
The Puppy Who Chased The Sun, 1950
The Boy Who Wanted to be a Fish,1951
When the Mississippi Was Wild, 1952
Home Is Up River, 1952
Touch Me Not: A Novel, 1952
Are Dogs Better Than Cats, 1953
Tom Benn and Blackbeard, the pirate, 1954
Why Cowboys Sing in Texas, 1950
Matilda, 1956
How Space Rockets Began (Scott, Foresman; Invitations to personal reading program), 1960
Augustus Rides the Border, 1961
How Basketball Began, (Scott, Foresman; Invitations to personal reading program), 1962

References 

1901 births
1964 deaths
American children's writers
Writers from Connecticut
American illustrators
People from Torrington, Connecticut
Yale University alumni